The Greater Montreal Athletics Association (GMAA) is an inter-mural sporting league in the Greater Montreal Area. It arranges inter-school sports events.

Fall Division 1 Championships

Boys Touch Football

Golf

Soccer

Volleyball

Winter Division 1 Championships

Basketball

Hockey

Indoor Track & Field

Wrestling

Spring Division 1 Championships

Rugby

External links
 GMAA homepage

See also
 Canadian Interuniversity Sport

Sport in Montreal
Education in Montreal
University and college sports in Canada
English-language education in Quebec
Quebec Anglophone culture in Montreal